Pavel Guvorsky (born 1884, date of death unknown) was a Russian fencer. He competed in three events at the 1912 Summer Olympics.

References

1884 births
Year of death missing
Male fencers from the Russian Empire
Olympic competitors for the Russian Empire
Fencers at the 1912 Summer Olympics